Park Hui-gyeong (also transliterated Park Hee-kyung, born 8 June 1979) is a South Korean fencer. He competed in the individual and team foil events at the 2004 Summer Olympics.

References

External links
 
 

1979 births
Living people
South Korean male foil fencers
Olympic fencers of South Korea
Fencers at the 2004 Summer Olympics